Navia involucrata is a plant species in the genus Navia. This species, of the origin family Bromeliaceae, is endemic to Venezuela.

References

Bromeliad (Navia involucrata)
Tropicos | Name - Navia involucrata L.B. Sm.

involucrata
Flora of Venezuela